Corey Pearson (born 9 January 1973) is an Australian former professional rugby league footballer who played in 1990 and 2000s. Pearson played for the Balmain Tigers, St. George Dragons, St. George Illawarra Dragons, Wests Tigers and the Parramatta Eels.

Background
Corey Pearson was born in New South Wales, Australia.

Playing career
Pearson made his debut for Balmain in Round 12 1995 against South Queensland at a time when the club was briefly known as the "Sydney Tigers", a name that the club adopted during the Super League war.

In 1997, Pearson joined St George and played in the club's last ever game as a stand-alone entity which was a 20–12 loss against Canterbury in the 1998 finals series.  In 1999, Pearson signed to play on with St George as they formed a joint venture with Illawarra.  Pearson played in the club's inaugural game as a joint venture against Parramatta.

In 2001, Pearson joined the Wests Tigers and played with the club until the end of 2003.  In 2004, Pearson joined Parramatta and retired at the end of the season with his last game being a 48–10 loss against the Sydney Roosters.

References

External links

1973 births
Living people
Australian rugby league players
Balmain Tigers players
St. George Dragons players
St. George Illawarra Dragons players
Wests Tigers players
Parramatta Eels players
Rugby league props
Rugby league players from New South Wales